"Don't think. Feel !!!" is the 16th single from a Japanese idol group Idoling!!!. It reached number 3 on the Oricon chart.  It was used as an ending theme song the anime TV series Fairy Tail . and its coupling song "Koi no 20 Rensa!!" was used an Puyo Puyo!! 20th Anniversary support song under the name "Puyo Puyo Idoling!!!" with new formation consisting all Idoling!!! members. Idoling!!! #25 Kaoru Gotou did not participate on this single due to hiatus for six months since April 12, 2011.

Track listing

Limited A-type edition

CD

DVD 
 "Don't think. Feel !!!" promotion video.
 Making-of video.

Limited B-type edition

CD

DVD 
 Fairy Tail credit-less ending video.

Normal edition

CD

References

External links 
  - Fuji TV
  - Pony Canyon

2011 singles
Idoling!!! songs
2011 songs
Pony Canyon singles
Fairy Tail